Prince Archie of Sussex (Archie Harrison; born 6 May 2019) is a member of the British royal family. He is the son of Prince Harry, Duke of Sussex, and Meghan, Duchess of Sussex. He is a grandson of King Charles III and is sixth in the line of succession to the British throne. He was born during the reign of his great-grandmother, Queen Elizabeth II.

Birth, family and infancy
Archie Harrison Mountbatten-Windsor was born at 05:26 BST (04:26 UTC) on 6 May 2019 at the Portland Hospital in London. He is the first child of the Duke and Duchess of Sussex. Unlike previous royal births, there was no immediate photocall at the hospital steps. Several landmarks were illuminated in different colours to mark the birth, including Niagara Falls, the CN Tower and the London Eye. His name was announced on 8 May 2019. He has mixed-race ancestry, having African-American and European-American maternal lineage. He has dual nationality of the United Kingdom and the United States. In a 2021 television interview, the Duchess said that while she was pregnant with him there were "concerns and conversations about how dark his skin might be when born" from a member of the royal family. 

Archie was christened wearing the royal christening gown by Justin Welby, Archbishop of Canterbury, on 6 July 2019 in the private chapel at Windsor Castle, with water from the River Jordan. In a break from royal tradition, his parents did not make public the identities of his godparents. Three of the godparents were later reported to be Charlie van Straubenzee, Tiggy Pettifer and Mark Dyer. He was shown to his great-grandparents Queen Elizabeth II and Prince Philip for the first time when he was two days old.

In early 2020, Archie's parents stepped down from their roles as working members of the royal family. The family then moved to North America and settled in Montecito, California in the summer of that year. His younger sister, Lilibet, was born in 2021.

Public appearances 
In September and October 2019, Archie accompanied his parents on a Southern African tour to Malawi, Angola, South Africa and Botswana. To mark his first birthday in 2020, he appeared in a storytime video with his mother as a part of the Save with Stories campaign, a project aimed at supporting children and families affected by the COVID-19 pandemic.

Title, styles, and succession
As heir apparent to his father's dukedom of Sussex, earldom of Dumbarton, and barony of Kilkeel, Archie was at birth and by custom entitled to use Prince Harry's senior subsidiary title, Earl of Dumbarton, as a courtesy. However, the media reported that the Duke and Duchess decided, instead, that Archie would be styled as Master Archie Harrison Mountbatten-Windsor, in accordance with their reported wish that he grow up as a private citizen.

Upon the accession of Charles III, Archie became entitled to use the title prince and style royal highness, as the child of a son of the monarch, pursuant to letters patent issued by King George V in 1917. However, sources reported that it was unclear whether he would use that title and style, noting that not all members of the royal family who are eligible for a title choose to use one. In the interview Oprah with Meghan and Harry, the Duchess of Sussex said that she had been told that changes would be made to remove that entitlement; Charles III's plans for a scaled-down royal family dated back to the 1990s.

The official British website of the royal family was updated to use the words "Prince Archie of Sussex" on 9 March 2023. It was reported that any titles would be used in formal settings, but not in everyday conversations by his parents.

See also
Family tree of the British royal family
List of living British princes and princesses

References

External links
Prince Archie of Sussex at the royal family website

2019 births
Living people
21st-century American people
21st-century English people
American children
American people of Danish descent
American people of English descent
American people of German descent
American people of Greek descent
American people of Russian descent
American people of Scottish descent
Children of peers and peeresses
English children
English people of African-American descent
English people of Danish descent
English people of German descent
English people of Greek descent
English people of Russian descent
English people of Scottish descent
Family of Charles III
House of Windsor
Markle family
Archie Mountbatten-Windsor
People from London
Prince Harry, Duke of Sussex
Princes of the United Kingdom
Royal children
British princes